Llwytmor is a satellite peak of Foel-fras, and forms a part of the Carneddau range. The summit is 849 metres (2,785 ft) above sea level and it contains a series of boulderfields, a shelter and several cairns. It is the 27th highest peak in Wales.
On a fine day to the north, the summit offers extensive views towards the Menai Strait, Anglesey and on exceptionally clear days the Isle of Man across the Irish Sea can be seen. The Lake District in England and the Wicklow Mountains in Ireland are also visible on clear days. Carneddau mountain ponies graze on the mountain throughout the year. Its full name Llwytmor Uchaf means "upper grey sea".

References

Mountains and hills of Snowdonia
Hewitts of Wales
Nuttalls
Abergwyngregyn
Mountains and hills of Gwynedd